The 1979 Tour de Suisse was the 43rd edition of the Tour de Suisse cycle race and was held from 13 June to 22 June 1979. The race started in Zürich and finished in Hendschiken. The race was won by Wilfried Wesemael of the TI–Raleigh team.

General classification

References

1979
Tour de Suisse
Tour de Suisse
1979 Super Prestige Pernod